The 2017–18 Maltese Premier League (known as the BOV Premier League for sponsorship reasons) was the 103rd season of top-flight league football in Malta. The season began on 18 August 2017 and ended on 22 April 2018. Hibernians were the defending champions, having won their 12th title the previous season.

Balzan and Valletta contended the league title for the whole season and were head-to-head in the final phases. On the last day of the season, on 21 April 2018, Valletta defeated Gżira United 2–1, while Balzan slipped in a 0–1 defeat against Hibernians, and as a result Valletta were crowned champions for the 24th time in their history.

Teams 

Pembroke Athleta are relegated after they finished twelfth the previous season. They are replaced by Lija Athletic the 2016–17 Maltese First Division champions, Senglea Athletic the 2016–17 Maltese First Division runners-up, and Naxxar Lions the 2016–17 Maltese First Division Third Place.

Kits 

 Additionally, referee kits are made by Adidas, sponsored by TeamSports and FXDD, and Nike has a new match ball.

Venues

Managerial changes

League table

Results 
Each team plays every other team in the league home-and-away for a total of 26 matches played each.

Relegation play-offs 

A play-off match took place between the twelfth-placed team from the Premier League, Tarxien Rainbows, and the third-placed team from the First Division, Zejtun Corinthians, for a place in the 2018–19 Maltese Premier League.

Top scorers

Awards

Monthly awards

References

External links 
 Official website

Maltese Premier League seasons
Malta
1